Adri Duycker (born 13 October 1946) is a retired Dutch cyclist. He was part of the Dutch teams that won a silver and bronze medals the 1970 and 1971 UCI Road World Championships in the team time trial.

References

1946 births
Living people
Dutch male cyclists
Sportspeople from Beverwijk
UCI Road World Championships cyclists for the Netherlands
Cyclists from North Holland
20th-century Dutch people
21st-century Dutch people